Shirl is a given name, often a short form (hypocorism) of Shirley. It may refer to:

People:
 Shirl Bernheim, stage name of American actress Shirley Raphael (1921–2009)
 Shirl Conway, stage name of American actress Shirley Crossman (1916–2007)
 Shirl, a stage name of Graeme Strachan (1952–2001), Australian singer, songwriter, radio and television presenter and carpenter
 Shirl Henke (born 1942), American romance novelist
 Shirley Shirl Jennings (1940–2003), one of the few people to regain his sight after nearly lifelong blindness
 Colleen Shirley Perry Smith (1924–1988), better known as Mum Shirl, Aboriginal Australian humanitarian, activist and social worker

Fictional characters:
 Laverne's name for Shirley in the American television series Laverne & Shirley
 Shirl, wife of Cockney Wanker in the British magazine Viz

Hypocorisms